Teenage Kicks were a Canadian alternative rock band based in Toronto, Canada. The band consisted of brothers Peter and Jeff van Helvoort.

Biography
Teenage Kicks formed in early 2010 and began performing by the summer of the same year in support of their first 7" release, which featured the songs “Shook Our Bones” and “I Get What You Give”. The original lineup was rounded out by the addition of Cameron Brunt on drums and Patrick Marchent on guitar. This was the configuration used when the band began work on their first self-produced EP titled “Rational Anthems” near the end of 2010. The EP was released on April 29, 2011. The EP garnered a good amount of positive press and put the band onto stage with an array of artists from Sloan to AWOLNATION to Kaiser Chiefs. By the fall of 2011 the band had added Christian Turner on guitar  in order to become a five piece. They began work on their next self-produced EP, “Be On My Side,” which was released on March 2, 2012 and was mixed by Dan Weston (Attack in Black, Shad, Classified). The band also launched a free music service known simply as “The Singles Club”, which offers no-cost downloads to members on a bi-monthly basis. The Club releases thus far have delved into covers, b-sides, alternate versions and a full-length live album.

In October 2012 Jeff and Patrick left the group and played their last show at Lee's Palace in their hometown of Toronto, but by January 2013 Jeff had returned and Christian was no longer with the group. The lineup had returned to a four piece and lead guitar duties had been taken over by Keegan Powell. The band announced that they would be traveling to West Hollywood, California to make their first full-length album in April 2013 with Alain Johannes (Jimmy Eat World, Queens of the Stone Age, Arctic Monkeys). Prior to recording, the band partook in their first SXSW festival. A couple of months after their arrival home, it was announced through the band's website that the record they had made in California would be shelved and that Peter van Helvoort would be rerecording and producing the second attempt at their debut album. The band played their last show ever at the Horseshoe Tavern on May 25, 2015. Former members projects include Christian Punk Band, Spells Of Vertigo, and Keegan Powell's eponymous solo project

The band played its last show at The Horseshoe Tavern on Saturday, May 23, 2015.  Peter Van Helvoort asserts there will never be a reunion.

Discography

Band members

Past
 Keegan Powell
 Patrick Marchent
 Christian Turner
 Cameron Brunt
 Peter Van Helvoort
 Jeff Van Helvoort

References

External links
Teenage Kicks Official Website
Teenage Kicks On Twitter
Teenage Kicks On Facebook

Canadian alternative rock groups
Musical groups from Toronto
Musical groups established in 2010
2010 establishments in Ontario